Laemodonta siamensis is a species of small air-breathing saltmarsh snails, terrestrial pulmonate gastropod mollusks in the family Ellobiidae.

Distribution 
The distribution of Laemodonta siamensis includes:
 Japan. It is critically endangered and endangered (CR＋EN) in Japan.
 Thailand
 Philippines

References

 Lozouet, P. & Plaziat, J.-C., 2008 Mangrove environments and molluscs, Abatan river, Bohol and Panglao islands, central Philippines,, p. 1–160, 38 pls

External links 

Ellobiidae
Gastropods described in 1875